Sinp'yŏng station is a railway halt in Sinp'yŏng-ri, greater Tanch'ŏn city, South Hamgyŏng province, North Korea, on the Kŭmgol Line of the Korean State Railway. It was opened on 4 December 1943 along with the rest of the Tongam–Paekkŭmsan section of the line.

References

Railway stations in North Korea